These are the New Territories East results of the 2012 Hong Kong legislative election. The election was held on 9 September 2012 and all 9 seats in New Territories East where consisted of North District, Tai Po District, Sai Kung District and Sha Tin District were contested. The pro-democracy camp strategically succeeded in holding six seats with only 56.9% of the votes. Raymond Chan Chi-chuen of the People Power and Gary Fan of Neo Democrats were elected for the first time. Former Civic Party legislator also returned to the LegCo representing the newly formed Labour Party.

Overall results
Before election:

Change in composition:

Candidates list

Results by districts

Opinion polling

See also
Legislative Council of Hong Kong
Hong Kong legislative elections
2012 Hong Kong legislative election

References

2012 Hong Kong legislative election